Oshri Levi, (born 15 January 1974) is an Israeli footballer. 
As of 2013 Oshri plays football for Hapoel Karmiel in Liga Gimel and also plays basketball for Hapoel Ma'a lot in Liga Alef

He played for Hapoel Kfar Saba in the Israeli Premier League, but was sacked by the club on the suspicion that he threw a match against Maccabi Haifa.

Since 2018, Levi serves as Hapoel Karmiel F.C.'s professional manager

Honours
Israel State Cup:
Winner (1): 2002
Liga Leumit:
Runner-up (1): 2003-04
Liga Alef (North):
Winner (1): 2008-09

References

1974 births
Living people
Israeli Jews
Israeli footballers
Hapoel Majd al-Krum F.C. players
Bnei Sakhnin F.C. players
Maccabi Tel Aviv F.C. players
Hapoel Nof HaGalil F.C. players
Hapoel Kfar Saba F.C. players
Ahva Arraba F.C. players
Hapoel Bnei Lod F.C. players
Hapoel Jerusalem F.C. players
Ironi Tiberias F.C. players
Hapoel Beit She'an F.C. players
Maccabi Sektzia Ma'alot Tarshiha F.C. players
F.C. Tzeirei Kafr Kanna players
Hapoel Karmiel F.C. players
Israeli Premier League players
Footballers from Hatzor HaGlilit
Liga Leumit players
Association football goalkeepers